The U.S. House Foreign Affairs Subcommittee on Global Health, Global Human Rights and International Organizations is a standing subcommittee within the House Foreign Affairs Committee. It was previously known as the Subcommittee on International Organizations, Human Rights, and Oversight and the Subcommittee on Oversight and Investigations. At the start of the 118th Congress, it was given jurisdiction over global health policy and global human rights, which was traditionally under the purview of the Africa subcommittee.

Jurisdiction
As of the 117th Congress, the subcommittee is one of two primary subcommittee with what the committee calls "functional jurisdiction" (the Africa, Global Health, and Human Rights Subcommittee also enjoys functional jurisdiction, but is primarily a "regional subcommittee"). The functional jurisdiction of the subcommittee allows to provide oversight and conduct investigations or any and all matters within the jurisdiction of the Full Committee, with concurrence of the chairman.

Members, 117th Congress

Historical membership rosters

112th Congress

116th Congress

External links
 Official site

References

Foreign Affairs Oversight and Investigations